Young Smyth Field Company Building is a historic light manufacturing loft building located in the Chinatown neighborhood of Philadelphia, Pennsylvania. It was built in 1901–1902, and is an eight-story, five bay wide building, with a limestone and glazed brick front facade. It also has terra cotta details. The building measures 73 feet wide and approximately 170 feet deep.

It was added to the National Register of Historic Places in 1992.

References

Industrial buildings and structures on the National Register of Historic Places in Philadelphia
Industrial buildings completed in 1902
Chinatown, Philadelphia
Textile mills in the United States